Alexander Home may refer to:

Sir Alexander Home of that ilk (died 1461)
Alexander Home, 1st Lord Home (died 1491), Scottish nobleman and soldier, son of Sir Alexander Home of that ilk]
Alexander Home, 2nd Lord Home (by 1468–1506), Scottish nobleman and soldier, Lord Chamberlain of Scotland, grandson of Alexander Home, 1st Lord Home
Alexander Home, 3rd Lord Home (died 1516), Scottish soldier and nobleman, Chamberlain of Scotland and March Warden
Alexander Home, 5th Lord Home (died 1575), Scottish nobleman
Sir Alexander Home, 1st Baronet (died 1698)
Alexander Home, 1st Earl of Home (1566–1619), Scottish nobleman
Alexander Home, 9th Earl of Home (died 1786), Scottish nobleman and clergyman
Alexander Home, 10th Earl of Home (1769–1841), British politician and nobleman
Alexander Home, 14th Earl of Home (1903–1995), British politician and Prime Minister

Similar spelling
 Alexander Hume (1558–1609), Scottish poet and Moderator of the General Assembly of the Church of Scotland